Domnus is a genus of assassin bug (family Reduviidae), in the subfamily Harpactorinae.

Species
 Domnus coloratus Distant, 1903
 Domnus condamini Villiers, 1963
 Domnus dimidiatus (Stål, 1855)
 Domnus flavoniger (Stål, 1858)

References

Reduviidae
Cimicomorpha genera